Raymond is an unincorporated hamlet in Sheridan County, Montana, United States, north of Plentywood. It is famous for its salmon and is located nine miles away from the Canada–US border.

The post office, since closed, opened in 1914. Originally called Riba, for lumber merchant Adolph Riba, the town changed its name in 1915 in honor of homesteader Joe Raymond. It was built along the Minneapolis, St. Paul and Sault Ste. Marie Railroad.

Climate
This climatic region is typified by large seasonal temperature differences, with warm to hot (and often humid) summers and cold (sometimes severely cold) winters.  According to the Köppen Climate Classification system, Raymond has a humid continental climate, abbreviated "Dfb" on climate maps.

References

Unincorporated communities in Sheridan County, Montana
Unincorporated communities in Montana